Grant McPhee is a Scottish film director, cinematographer and writer. His films include the music documentaries Big Gold Dream, Teenage Superstars and the drama, Far From the Apple Tree starring Sorcha Groundsell. He won the prestigious audience choice award in 2015 for his film Big Gold Dream at the 2015 edition of the Edinburgh International Film Festival. In 2022, he co-wrote the book, Hungry Beat, an oral history of Scottish Post-Punk music which was published by White Rabbit Books.

Filmography

Awards and nominations

References

External links

Grant McPhee Official Website
Grant McPhee BFI Profile

Living people
Scottish film directors
Scottish screenwriters
Year of birth missing (living people)